Malapterurus leonensis is a species of electric catfish endemic to Sierra Leone, where it is found in the coastal rivers.  This species grows to a length of  SL.

Threats
The Florida Fish and Wildlife Conservation Commission has listed the electric catfish as a prohibited species. Prohibited nonnative species, as they are considered to be dangerous to the ecology and/or health and welfare of the people in Florida.  Currently, no indication of M. leonensis in the United States in the wild or in trade was found.

References

 

Malapteruridae
Catfish of Africa
Fish of West Africa
Endemic fauna of Sierra Leone
Fish described in 2000
Strongly electric fish